William Duffield may refer to:

 William Duffield (painter) (1816–1863), British still-life painter
 William E. Duffield (1922–2001), member of the Pennsylvania State Senate, 1971–1978
 William Ward Duffield (1820–1912), solicitor, and brother of Walter Duffield.
 William Ward Duffield (1823–1907), coal industry executive, railroad construction engineer and Union Army officer